Lowes Lee Moore (born May 5, 1957) is a former American National Basketball Association (NBA) player. Moore was a 2-time Continental Basketball Association (CBA) champion for the Albany Patroons under coaches Phil Jackson and George Karl. Most known for his 40-point performance against Notre Dame.

Moore was born in Plymouth, North Carolina.  He was raised in Mount Vernon, New York, where he currently resides with his wife of 34 years, Patrice Wallace-Moore and their four children, Michelle, Shireyll, Lowes III, Isaiah, and their Godson Jamayal.

Lowes graduated from Mount Vernon High School in 1976 and West Virginia University in 1980. After receiving Basketball All-American Honorable Mention in his sophomore and junior years and All-American Honors in his senior year, he was drafted by the New Jersey Nets. He played three years in the NBA with the Nets, Cleveland Cavaliers and San Diego (Los Angeles) Clippers. He also spent five years in the Continental Basketball Association on two championship teams with the Albany Patroons.  He was coached by the legendary Phil Jackson and the controversial Bill Musselman.  He has coached basketball on the high school, college and professional level.

Moore received his license to preach the gospel from Macedonia Baptist Church in February, 1986 and is currently an ordained Elder at the Emmanuel Pentecostal Faith Temple., under the leadership of Bishop Leon Dixon.  His dream for years has been to be an inspirational leader to young people and to assist them in becoming successful in all aspects of their lives. As a result, he established a program called the Hoop School in the 1980s in Albany, NY, where he and fellow professional athletes conducted motivational speeches and workshops for adolescents, parents, and coaches.  Currently, this program is entitled Gospel Sports Today (Men N Charge).

Moore has been an inspirational speaker at various sites, which include NFL and NBA Pre-Game Chapels, corporations, businesses, churches, schools and community agencies.  Elder Moore prides himself on being a student of the gospel and life.  Wherever you see him, he is learning, so that he can become a better teacher.  He not only practices what he preaches, but he preaches and teaches what he practices.  He will often tell someone to make sure they give back what they've been given, and he has done that.

Moore has been a leader of men in the Mt. Vernon Community for many years.  Over the past several years he began bringing male mentors into the school district initiating the 100 Positive Men.  His work with young men also led him to the Nepperhan Community Center in Yonkers.  This passion also led to his desire to work with the Peacekeepers of Mt. Vernon which began May 2010.  A leader in the organization, Elder Moore can be found marching, organizing and working with the men and young men of Mt. Vernon.

Mr. Moore is currently the Executive Director of the Mount Vernon Boys and Girls Club, the place which provided him guidance and direction in life. He has helped many youth prepare for college.  A humble man from the housing projects of Mount Vernon, he is now successful, and still giving back.

After being selected by the New Jersey Nets in the 1980 NBA draft, Moore played in three seasons with three different teams: Nets, Cleveland Cavaliers, and San Diego Clippers.  He is currently the Executive Director of the Boys & Girls Club of Mount Vernon, New York.

References

External links
Career stats at basketball-reference.com

1957 births
Living people
Albany Patroons players
American men's basketball players
Basketball players from North Carolina
Billings Volcanos players
Cleveland Cavaliers players
Continental Basketball Association coaches
New Jersey Nets draft picks
New Jersey Nets players
Parade High School All-Americans (boys' basketball)
People from Plymouth, North Carolina
Point guards
San Diego Clippers players
West Virginia Mountaineers men's basketball players
Mount Vernon High School (New York) alumni